Teluk Bayur (Minangkabau: Taluak Bayua) formerly known as Emma Haven or Emmahaven is a port located in Bayur Bay of Padang city, West Sumatra, Indonesia. The port, the largest and busiest on the western coast of Sumatra, is operated by the government owned company PT. (Persero) Pelabuhan Indonesia II (Indonesia Port Corporation II).

Built in 1888 by Netherlands colonial government, on April 29, 2013 a new container terminal was officially opened by West Sumatra Governor that can handle more than 4,000 containers in a 46,886 square-meter area.

Renovation
Renovation project run from 2011 to 2015 with a cost of Rp1.7 trillion ($185.8 million) will change the conventional face of Teluk Bayur Port into a modern one. The new port will reduce the time ships have to queue from an average of 10 days to a reasonable time with 3 separated berths to handle containers and bulk goods. A multi-purpose terminal and container terminal will also be expanded from 150 meters to 500 meters with 7 cranes, so 16 large-scale ships can dock at the same time, rising from its current capacity of 10 ships.

References

External links

Official site of Teluk Bayur Port
Official site of PT (Persero) Pelabuhan Indonesia II (Indonesia Port Corporation II)

T
West Sumatra